Thorpe Park No 1 Gravel Pit is a  biological Site of Special Scientific Interest (SSSI) east of Virginia Water in Surrey.  It is part of the Thorpe Park theme park.

Ecology
This former gravel pit has been designated an SSSI because it is nationally important for wintering gadwall. There are also several other species of wintering wildfowl, such as goldeneyes and smew.

History 
The gravel pits at Thorpe Park were developed by Ready Mixed Concrete Ltd in the 1930s for the extraction of both sand and gravel for use in construction. They were intentionally flooded in the 1970s when the site was re-purposed for recreational use.

The British Trust for Ornithology noted a Wetlands Advisory Service report of 2003 that suggested recreational activities at the site might have contributed to a decline in recorded gadwall numbers. The site is used for waterskiing but the activity is prohibited between 1 October - 31 March, which is the period when the gadwalls use it for feeding. At other times of the year, the number of participants is restricted.

References

Further reading

Sites of Special Scientific Interest in Surrey
Lakes of Surrey